Lee Roy Atalifo, (born 10 March 1988) is a Fiji professional Rugby union footballer who currently plays for Edinburgh Rugby in the United Rugby Championship. 

He was part of the Fijian squad at the 2015 Rugby World Cup. Atalifo works as a firefighter for the National Fire Authority in Fiji. In 2015 he joined Italian club Rugby Rovigo Delta. He was named in Canterbury's squad for the 2016 Mitre 10 Cup.	

On 27 April 2017, Atalifo signed for English club Jersey Reds in the RFU Championship from the 2017-18 season.

On 11 March 2020, Atalifo signed for Edinburgh Rugby in the United Rugby Championship from the 2020–21 season.

References

External links

1988 births
Fijian rugby union players
Fiji international rugby union players
Fijian people of Rotuman descent
Living people
Rugby union props
Canterbury rugby union players
Rugby Rovigo Delta players
Jersey Reds players
Edinburgh Rugby players